, provisional designation , is a dark and elongated asteroid, classified as near-Earth object and potentially hazardous asteroid of the Apollo group, approximately  in diameter. It was discovered on 30 September 2014, by NASA's Wide-field Infrared Survey Explorer telescope (WISE) in Earth's orbit. Closely observed at Goldstone and Arecibo in February 2018, it has a rotation period of 8.7 hours.

Orbit and classification 

 is a member of the Apollo asteroids, which cross the orbit of Earth. Apollo's are the largest group of near-Earth objects with nearly 10 thousand known objects. It orbits the Sun at a distance of 0.90–1.70 AU once every 18 months (541 days; semi-major axis of 1.30 AU). Its orbit has an eccentricity of 0.30 and an inclination of 30° with respect to the ecliptic. With an aphelion of 1.70 AU, it is also a Mars-crosser, as it crosses the orbit of the Red Planet at 1.666 AU. The body's observation arc begins with its official discovery observation by WISE in September 2014.

Close approaches 

As a potentially hazardous asteroid,  has a minimum orbital intersection distance (MOID) with Earth of less than 0.05 AU and a diameter of greater than 150 meters. The Earth-MOID is currently , which translates into 13.8 lunar distances (LD).

2018 flyby

On 7 February 2018 it passed  from the Earth when its apparent magnitude brightened to 14. Goldstone observed it until the following day. While this was an 8.1-million kilometer flyby, the next close flyby of 6.3 million km will occur on 5 February 2058, and another 7.6 million km on 8 February 2095. It will also have a 3.2 million km flyby of Mars on 26 September 2048.

Physical characteristics 

The asteroid's spectral type is unknown. Due to its unusually low albedo (see below) it is likely a carbonaceous C-type asteroid.

Rotation period 

On 9 February, radiometric observations by the Arecibo Observatory revealed that the asteroid has an elongated, lumpy shape. The radar images also gave it a rotational period between 8 and 9 hours. A refined period of 8.7 hour agrees with (photometric) lightcurve observations by American photometrist Brian Warner at the Center for Solar System Studies during 9–11 February 2018, who obtained a period of 8.729 hours with a high brightness amplitude of 0.93 magnitude, which also indicates a non-spheroidal shape.

Diameter and albedo 

According to the survey carried out by the NEOWISE mission of NASA's WISE telescope,  measures 0.971 kilometers in diameter and its surface has an albedo of 0.068. Data from the Arecibo Telescope released in 2022 showed an unusually high radar albedo, possibly indicating rich metal content.

Numbering and naming 

This minor planet was numbered by the Minor Planet Center on 4 November 2017. As of 2018, it has not been named.

Gallery

Notes

References

External links 

 List of the Potentially Hazardous Asteroids (PHAs), Minor Planet Center
 List Of Apollo Minor Planets (by designation), ''Minor Planet
 Asteroid Lightcurve Database (LCDB), query form (info )
 
 
 

505657
505657
505657
Near-Earth objects in 2018
20140930